Moriba Joseph Morain (born 8 October 1992) is a Trinidadian sprinter.

He won a gold medal in the 200 metres at the 2010 Central American and Caribbean Junior Championships in Santo Domingo.

In 2011, Morain finished second behind Rondel Sorrillo in the 200 metres at the Sagicor National Open Track and Field Championship.

Personal bests

Competition record

1Disqualified in the final
2Did not finish in the quarterfinals

References

External links

1992 births
Living people
Trinidad and Tobago male sprinters
World Athletics Championships athletes for Trinidad and Tobago
Athletes (track and field) at the 2011 Pan American Games
Pan American Games competitors for Trinidad and Tobago